Wolverine Air is a charter airline operating out of Fort Simpson, Northwest Territories, Canada. It operates ecotourism flights and government contract flights such as fire patrols in the summer. It also supports the search and extraction of natural resources in the area.

History
Founded in 1972, the airline has since grown to include six aircraft including a recently purchased BN-2A Islander.

Fleet
As of August 2020 the Wolverine Air fleet includes four aircraft:

1 Cessna 172S
1 Cessna A185E
1 Cessna U206G
1 Britten Norman BN.2A-26

External links
 http://209.160.2.171/about_us.html

Charter airlines of Canada